The Commissioner of Police is the head of the Singapore Police Force (SPF). The commissioner is assisted by the Deputy Commissioner of Police and reports to the Minister for Home Affairs.

The position was created with the passing of the Police Act in 1857, in response to calls for a full-time dedicated police officer to helm the police force in response to escalating cases of violent crime in Singapore during that period. Thomas Dunman thus became the first police commissioner, and the first full-time superintendent of police, with a salary of 800 rupees per month.

When Singapore, Malacca and Penang became Crown colonies in 1867, the role of the police commissioner was expanded to include that of the entire Straits Settlements, with the title changed to Inspector-General of Police. This lasted until the Japanese occupation of Singapore in 1942, before the position was restored as the Commissioner of Police in 1946 with the return of the British and the gradual instatement of self governance.

The President of Singapore appoints the Commissioner of Police on the advice from the Cabinet, and can revoke his or her appointment.

Commissioners and Inspectors-General of Police

Commissioner of Police, Straits Settlements Police
 Thomas Dunman (1857–1871)

Inspector-General of Police, Straits Settlements Police
 C B Plunket (1871–1876)
 Samuel Dunlop (1876–1890)
 R W Maxwell (1891–1895)
 E G Pennefather (1895–1906)
 W A Cuscaden (1906–1914)
 A R Chandellor (1914–1923)
 G C Denham (1923–1925)
 Harold Fairburn (1925–1935)
 Rene H de S Onraet (1935–1939)
 Arthur Harold Dickinson (1939–1942)

Commissioner of Police, Singapore Police Force
 R E Foulger (1946–1951)
 J P Pennefather-Evans (1951–1952)
 Nigel G Morris (1952–1957)
 E Alan G Blades (1957–1963)
 John Le Cain (1963–1967)
 Cheam Kim Seang (1967–1971)
 Tan Teck Khim (1971–1979)
 Goh Yong Hong (1979–1992)
 Tee Tua Ba (1992–1997)
 Khoo Boon Hui (1997–2010)
 Ng Joo Hee  (2010–2015)
 Hoong Wee Teck (2015–present)

References

"Policing Singapore in the 19th & 20th centuries", Peer M. Akbur, Singapore Police Force, 2002 

Lists of Singaporean people
Police ranks
Singapore Police Force
Singapore law-related lists
1857 establishments in the British Empire